Marvel's Runaways, or simply Runaways, is an American television series created by Josh Schwartz and Stephanie Savage for the streaming service Hulu, based on the Marvel Comics superhero team of the same name. It is set in the Marvel Cinematic Universe (MCU), sharing continuity with the films and other television series of the franchise. The series is produced by ABC Signature Studios, Marvel Television and Fake Empire Productions, with Schwartz and Savage serving as showrunners.

Rhenzy Feliz, Lyrica Okano, Virginia Gardner, Ariela Barer, Gregg Sulkin, and Allegra Acosta star as the Runaways, six teenagers from different backgrounds who unite against their parents, the Pride, portrayed by Angel Parker, Ryan Sands, Annie Wersching, Kip Pardue, Ever Carradine, James Marsters, Brigid Brannagh, Kevin Weisman, Brittany Ishibashi, and James Yaegashi. Julian McMahon also stars in the second season as Jonah, after recurring in the first, while Clarissa Thibeaux stars in the third season as Xavin, after recurring in the second.

A film from Marvel Studios based on the Runaways began development in May 2008, before being shelved in 2013 due to the success of The Avengers. In August 2016, Marvel Television announced that Runaways had received a pilot order from Hulu, after being developed and written by Schwartz and Savage. Casting for the Runaways and the Pride were revealed in February 2017. Filming on the pilot began in Los Angeles in February 2017. The series was officially ordered by Hulu in May 2017.

The first season was released from November 21, 2017, to January 9, 2018. The show was renewed for a 13-episode second season, which was released in its entirety on December 21, 2018. The third and final season of ten episodes was released on December 13, 2019.

Premise
Six teenagers from different backgrounds unite against a common enemy – their criminal parents, who collectively run an organization called Pride. In the second season, the teenagers are now on the run from their parents, living on their own and figuring out how to stop Pride. The third season sees Nico Minoru and the other members of the team face off against aliens and Morgan le Fay.

Cast and characters

Main
 Rhenzy Feliz as Alex Wilder: A nerd who longs to reunite with his childhood friends. He has a high intellect and is the leader of the Runaways. 
 Lyrica Okano as Nico Minoru: A Wiccan who isolates herself with her gothic appearance and is a member of the Runaways. Unlike the comics, Nico does not summon the Staff of One through self-harm. Okano said this was tweaked, "for good reason" as there would be "a lot of young teenagers watching the show and we don't want to promote anything like self-harm because that's serious". She added that an element of drawing blood would still be involved.
 Virginia Gardner as Karolina Dean: A human-alien hybrid burdened by her religious upbringing who wants to pursue her own desires instead of following in her mother's footsteps, and is a member of the Runaways. Karolina has the ability of flight, to glow with rainbow-colored light, and to shoot beams of light.
 Ariela Barer as Gertrude Yorkes: A riot grrrl, social activist, and a member of the Runaways. She also has a telepathic link with her genetically engineered dinosaur, Old Lace.
 Gregg Sulkin as Chase Stein: A high school lacrosse player who is often dismissed as a dumb jock, but displays brilliance in engineering and is a member of the Runaways. Sulkin and the writers wanted the character to be "more layered" than the comics, and Sulkin felt that Chase was the most changed of the Runaways from the source material. The character is depicted as having the potential to be as much of a genius as his father is, and builds gadgets, including powerful weaponized gauntlets called "Fistigons". Connor Falk portrays a young Chase.
 Allegra Acosta as Molly Hayes Hernandez:The youngest member of the Runaways who is characterized by her positive attitude. Molly discovers she has the ability of superhuman strength and invulnerability. Evelyn Angelos portrays a young Molly.
 Angel Parker as Catherine Wilder: Alex's mother, a successful lawyer, and a member of Pride.
 Ryan Sands as Geoffrey Wilder: Alex's father and a self-made business man who had a grueling path to his success and is a member of Pride.
 Annie Wersching as Leslie Ellerh Dean:Karolina's mother, one of the leaders of the cult-like religious group the Church of Gibborim and a member of the Pride. Mia Topalian portrays a young Leslie Ellerh, while Charlie Townsend portrays her as a toddler.
 Kip Pardue as Frank Dean: Karolina's father, a former teen star who is struggling in his professional acting career and becomes one of the leaders of the Church of Gibborim. Unlike the comics, Frank is not currently a member of Pride. Pardue described the character as the "liaison" between the Runaways and Pride, saying, "This whole show is about the kids fighting their parents. Frank toes that line and has to find out where his allegiances lie".
 Ever Carradine as Janet Stein: Chase's mother who has a brilliant mind, is "a perfect PTA mom", and a member of Pride. Sorel Carradine portrays a young Janet.
 James Marsters as Victor Stein: Chase's father, an engineering genius and a member of Pride. Marsters was inspired by Vincent D'Onofrio's portrayal of Wilson Fisk in Daredevil, saying it was "exactly opposite of what I was expecting", and also looked for common ground with Victor, saying, "I'm not an abusive parent but I'm not a perfect parent. I don't think anyone is." He added that Victor just wants Chase to live up to his potential. Tim Pocock portrays a young Victor. 
 Brigid Brannagh as Stacey Yorkes: Gert's mother, a bioengineer, and a member of Pride.
 Kevin Weisman as Dale Yorkes: Gert's father, a bioengineer, and a member of Pride.
 Brittany Ishibashi as Tina Minoru: Nico's mother who is a brilliant innovator, ruthless CEO, and perfectionist "tiger mom" who is a member of Pride. The character previously appeared in the film Doctor Strange, in a minor role as a Master of the Mystic Arts, portrayed by Linda Louise Duan. The producers felt free to recast the role and create a different version of Tina Minoru since Duan was not named as the character in the film.
 James Yaegashi as Robert Minoru: Nico's father and a member of Pride who is a brilliant innovator.
 Julian McMahon as Jonah: Karolina's biological father, a member of the alien race known as the Gibborim who is the Pride's benefactor. McMahon described Jonah as "the wealthy guy who's pretty ego-driven and mission-driven... who's trying to accomplish certain things and if something were to get in his way he'd plow through it", which he felt was similar to Victor von Doom, whom he portrayed in Fantastic Four and its sequel. He also revealed that he did not appear in the earlier episodes as the character in his near-death state, as he had been cast after the first four episodes had been completed. Ric Sarabia portrayed the character in this state, which McMahon stated took five hours of make up application to achieve.
 Clarissa Thibeaux as Xavin: A shape shifting alien who believes in a prophecy that they are betrothed to Karolina.

Recurring

Introduced in season 1
 Danielle Campbell as Eiffel: A girl who attends Atlas Academy and looks down on Karolina and has a crush on Chase. 
 Pat Lentz as Aura: A member of the Church of Gibborim who works for the Deans. Sarah Ann Vail portrays a young Aura.
 Heather Olt as Frances: A member of the Church of Gibborim who works for the Deans. Alexa Marie Anderson portrays a young Frances.
 DeVaughn Nixon as Darius Davis: An old associate of Geoffrey's who holds a grudge against him. 
 Cody Mayo as Vaughn Kaye: Leslie Dean's assistant at the Church of Gibborim 
 Alex Fernandez as Flores: An LAPD lieutenant who works under the Pride. 
 Ozioma Akagha as Tamar Davis: Darius' wife who is pregnant with, and eventually gave birth to, his son, Xerxes. 

Old Lace, a genetically engineered Deinonychus telepathically linked with Gert Yorkes, appears in the series. The character is portrayed by a puppet that was operated by six people, including one person pumping air through the puppet to show the dinosaur breathing. Barer called the puppet "incredible ... You see her emotions. We don't not make use of that."

Introduced in season 2
 Ajiona Alexus as Livvie: Darius' sister-in-law and Alex's love interest. 
 Helen Madelyn Kim as Megan: A millennial employee at Pride who is unknowingly abused by her bosses. 
 Myles Bullock as Anthony "AWOL" Wall: Flores' corrupt partner who goes after the Runaways.

Introduced in season 3
 Elizabeth Hurley as Morgan le Fay: A powerful sorceress of the Dark Dimension.
 Scarlett Byrne as Bronwyn: A member of Morgan le Fey's coven of witches.

Guest

Introduced in season 1
 Zayne Emory as Brandon: A member of Chase's lacrosse team. 
 Timothy Granaderos as Lucas: A member of Chase's lacrosse team. 
 Nicole Wolf as Destiny Gonzalez: A young woman who joins the Church of Gibborim and is sacrificed soon after by the Pride. 
 Nathan Davis Jr. as Andre: An associate of Darius' who is used as a sacrifice for the Pride. 
 Lee Fraley as David Ellerh: The founder of the Church of Gibborim and Leslie's father. Nathan Sutton portrays a young David. 
 Ryan Doom as Alphona: Chase's lacrosse coach. 
 Devan Chandler Long as Kincaid: A man hired by Tina Minoru for devious purposes. 
 Kimmy Shields as a supporter of Gert's club. 
 Anjelika Washington as a supporter of Gert's club. 
 Cooper Mothersbaugh as a supporter of Gert's club. 
 Amanda Suk as Amy Minoru: Nico's sister, Alex's best friend and Tina and Robert's daughter who died prior to the beginning of the series. Chandler "ChaCha" Shen portrays a young Amy. 
 Vladimir Caamaño as Gene Hernandez: A geologist who is Molly's father and a former member of Pride who died in a fire. 
 Carmen Serano as Alice Hernandez: A geologist who is Molly's mother and a former member of Pride who died in a fire. 
 Jorge Diaz as Earl: A friendly social activist that Gert befriends. 
 Marlene Forte as Graciela Aguirre: A distant relative of Molly's. 

Stan Lee makes a cameo appearance as a limo driver.

Introduced in season 2
 Ryan Dorsey as Mike: A homeless biker who causes trouble for the Runaways.
 Jan Luis Castellanos as Topher: A mysterious street kid with super strength who briefly joins the Runaways. 
 Efrain Figueroa as Joseph: Topher's father who was injured by his son. 
 Rose Portillo as Eileen: Topher's mother who kicked him out of the house.
 Veronica Diaz as Sofia: Topher's sister who is a nurse. 
 Damien Diaz as Oscar Gonzalez: Destiny's brother who Frank kills in self defense. 
 Elayn J. Taylor as Nana B: Darius' mother and Tamar's mother-in-law. 
 Brie Carter as Mary: A millennial employee at Pride who is unknowingly abused by her bosses. 
 Steve O'Young as Mitch: A member of AWOL's strike team. 
 Kathleen Quinlan as Susan Ellerh: A member of the Church of Gibborim and Leslie's mother 
 Kara Royster as Wendy: A millennial employee at Pride who takes an interest in Chase. 
Introduced this season is Darius and Tamar's infant son Xerxes.

Introduced in season 3
 Anjali Bhimani as Mita Nansari: An employee at WIZARD.
 Emily Alabi as Cassandra: A member of Morgan le Fey's coven of witches. 
 John Ales as Quinton the Great: A once great magician and the original owner of the Hostel. 
 Marilyn Tokuda as Akari Minoru: Tina's mother and Nico's grandmother. 
 Minae Noji as Tokiko Minoru: Tina's sister and Nico's aunt. 
 Brianna Ishibashi as Judith Minoru: Tina's sister and Nico's aunt. 
 Granville Ames as Curtis Stein: Victor's father and Chase's grandfather. 
 Elliot Fletcher as Max: An unfortunate WIZARD intern who befriends Gert.
 Martin Martinez as Bodhi: A member of the renovated Church of Gibborim who befriends Molly. 
 Claudia Sulewski as Julie: Karolina's girlfriend from an alternate future. 
 Olivia Holt as Tandy Bowen / Dagger:A teenager with the ability to emit light daggers that can inflict bodily pain, dazzle, and purge addictions from her targets from a distance. Additionally, she can see the greatest hopes of those she touches and even steal them for herself. Holt starred as the character on the show Cloak & Dagger.
 Aubrey Joseph as Ty Johnson / Cloak:A teenager with the ability to generate and engulf others in shadow and transport them to the Dark Dimension. In addition, he can see the greatest fears of those he touches as well as teleport over long distances. Joseph starred as the character on Cloak & Dagger.
Introduced this season is Jonah and Leslie's infant daughter Elle.

Episodes

Season 1 (2017–18)

Season 2 (2018)

Season 3 (2019)

Production

Development
Brian K. Vaughan was hired to write a screenplay for Marvel Studios in May 2008, based on his comic book Runaways. In April 2010, Marvel hired Peter Sollett to direct the film, and a month later Drew Pearce signed on to write a new script. Development on the film was put on hold the following October, and Pearce explained in September 2013 that the Runaways film had been shelved due to the success of The Avengers; the earliest the film could be made was for Phase Three of the Marvel Cinematic Universe. In October 2014, after announcing Marvel's Phase Three films without Runaways, Marvel Studios president Kevin Feige said the project was "still an awesome script that exists in our script vault ... In our television and future film discussions, it's always one that we talk about, because we have a solid draft there. [But] we can't make them all."

Marvel Television, based at ABC Studios, was waiting for the right showrunner before moving forward with a television take on the characters. Josh Schwartz and Stephanie Savage, whose company Fake Empire Productions had an overall deal with ABC, independently brought up the property during a general meeting with the studio, and, by August 2016, the pair had spent a year conversing with Marvel about turning Runaways into a television series. That month, it was announced that streaming service Hulu had ordered a pilot episode and scripts for a full season of Runaways, to be co-produced by Marvel Television, ABC Signature Studios, and Fake Empire Productions. Hulu was believed to already have "an eye toward a full-season greenlight". Executive producer Jeph Loeb felt "it was an easy decision" to have Hulu air the series over the other networks Marvel Television works with, because "[w]e were very excited about the possibility of joining a network that was young and growing in the same way that when we went to Netflix when it was young and growing on the original side. It really feels like we're in the right place at the right time with the right show." Loeb and Marvel Television were also impressed by the success of Hulu's The Handmaid's Tale, which helped further justify the decision. Schwartz and Savage wrote the pilot, and serve as showrunners on the series, as well as executive producers alongside Loeb and Jim Chory. In May 2017, Runaways received a 10-episode series order from Hulu at their annual advertising upfront presentation.

Fake Empire's Lis Rowinski produces the series, and Vaughan serves as an executive consultant. On this, Vaughan noted he "did a little consulting early in the process", but felt the series "found the ideal 'foster parents' in Josh Schwartz and Stephanie Savage … [who] lovingly adapted [the comics] into a stylish drama that feels like contemporary Los Angeles". He also praised the cast, crew and writers working on the series, and felt the pilot looked "like an Adrian Alphona comic", referring to the artist who worked with Vaughan when he created the characters. Loeb said that it had been Schwartz and Savage who had asked that Vaughan be involved, and said that this was something that "a lot of showrunners don't immediately gravitate towards". In discussions with Vaughan, Marvel found that he "really wanted to be involved and make sure that it was done, not just properly, but in a way that it would last 100 episodes". On January 8, 2018, Hulu renewed the series for a 13-episode second season.

On March 24, 2019, Hulu renewed the series for a ten-episode third season. That November, it was announced that the third season would be the series's last.

Writing
Schwartz was a fan of the Runaways comic for some time, and introduced it to Savage, saying, "When you're a teenager, everything feels like life and death, and the stakes in this story—really felt like that." Loeb described the series as The O.C. of the Marvel Cinematic Universe (MCU), which Schwartz said meant "treating the problems of teenagers as if they are adults" and having the series "feel true and authentic to the teenage experience, even in this heightened context". Loeb noted that it would deal with modern political issues by saying, "This is a time when figures of authority are in question, and this is a story where teenagers are at that age where they see their parents as fallible and human. Just because someone is in charge, doesn't mean that they're here to do good." The producers did note that the series would explore the parents' perspective as well, with the pilot telling the story from the Runaways' perspective, and the second episode showing the same story from their parents'—the Pride's—perspective, with the two stories converging midway through the first season.

Schwartz likened the tone of Runaways to that of the comics it was based on, calling it "so distinct", saying much of the tone Vaughn used when writing the comics overlapped with the tones Schwartz and Savage like to work in. The pair were excited by the freedom given to them by Hulu over the usual broadcasters they were used to working with, such as allowing the children to swear in the show, not having set lengths for each episode, and being able to explore the parents' story; Hulu wanted "something that felt broad and where we could push the envelope in places". Schwartz described the series as a coming-of-age story and a family drama, with focus on the characters that can lead to long stretches of the series not featuring super powers, so "if you didn't see the show title, you wouldn't know that you were in a Marvel show for long stretches ... That was our aesthetic starting place, but there are episodes where there's some good [Marvel] stuff."

Speaking to the second season, Schwartz felt the series would "accelerate" since the season would be following the kids on the run, saying, "Our focus shifts to these kids and trying to survive in the streets… there's a greater sense of tension and momentum in keeping with where we are in this part of the story." He added that the kids' experience on the run would force them to grow up and make them confront and deal with adult themes quickly. He added that the relationship between Nico and Karolina that began at the end of the first season would be "the emotional core" of the second. As for the parents in the season, Schwartz described them as racing against the clock "to find their kids before something catastrophic potentially could occur". Since the kids know about their powers, they are utilized more in the season. Additionally, the hostel the kids move into is a dilapidated mansion under Griffith Park.

With the third season being the final one of the series, "the story [was] said to come to a natural ending point". When crafting the season, Schwartz and Savage were unsure if the season would be the last for the series, so they "wanted to ensure that the finale was as satisfying as possible" and crafted it as if it was a series finale, while "hav[ing] the potential for another story out there whether it’s something that we get to see onscreen or something that lives on in the imagination of the audience." The final moments of the episode see Alex find a note from his future self, telling him to hide "Mancha" and to kill Nico; in the comics, Victor Mancha was the son of Ultron who would join the Runaways to become a hero, and Alex betrays his friends. Time travel elements are also featured in the final episode, something teased in the previous seasons, which Savage said was "in the DNA of the comics so it was something that we wanted to honor".

Casting

In February 2017, Marvel announced the casting of the Runaways, with Rhenzy Feliz as Alex Wilder, Lyrica Okano as Nico Minoru, Virginia Gardner as Karolina Dean, Ariela Barer as Gert Yorkes, Gregg Sulkin as Chase Stein, and Allegra Acosta as Molly Hernandez. Shortly after, Marvel announced the casting of the Pride, with Ryan Sands as Geoffrey Wilder, Angel Parker as Catherine Wilder, Brittany Ishibashi as Tina Minoru, James Yaegashi as Robert Minoru, Kevin Weisman as Dale Yorkes, Brigid Brannagh as Stacey Yorkes, Annie Wersching as Leslie Dean, Kip Pardue as Frank Dean, James Marsters as Victor Stein, and Ever Carradine as Janet Stein. Loeb praised casting director Patrick Rush, explaining that all of the series regulars for Runaways were the producers' first choice for the role. The majority of the children are portrayed by "fresh faces", which was an intentional choice. By August 2017, Julian McMahon had been cast in the recurring role of Jonah. He was promoted to series regular for the second season.

For the second season, Schwartz noted that "really popular, exciting characters" from the comics would appear. In October 2018, it was announced that Jan Luis Castellanos had joined the cast as Topher. Clarissa Thibeaux was cast as Xavin.

In June 2019, Elizabeth Hurley was announced as cast in the role of Morgan le Fay for the third season.

Filming
Filming on the pilot began by February 10, 2017, in Los Angeles, under the working title Rugrats, and concluded on March 3. Director Brett Morgen was given free rein by Marvel and Hulu to establish the look of the series, and wanted to create a feel that was "very grounded and authentic". He also looked to differentiate between the hand-held, gritty world of the Runaways and the more stylistic world of the Pride. He felt the latter could be explored more in the series moving forward, but was not available to direct any more episodes of the season. Following completion of the pilot and the show's pick-up to series, there was concern among the cast and crew that the impending writers' strike would prevent the series to move forward. However, the strike did not happen, and filming on the rest of the season began at the end of June, again in Los Angeles. Production on the season had concluded by October 21.

Production on the second season began the week of April 23, 2018, again in Los Angeles under the working title Rugrats. Filming on the season continued until late September 2018. Filming for the third season began on May 13, 2019.

Music
In May 2017, Siddhartha Khosla was hired to compose the music for the series. Khosla said that, due to his history as a songwriter, his scoring process involves "working on these song-stories and weaving them through different episodes". He described the Runaways score as being "completely synthesized", utilizing analog synthesizers from the 1980s, specifically the Roland Juno-60 and Oberheim Electronics' synths. Khosla compared the "alternative feel" of his score to Depeche Mode, adding "there is an element of rebellion, so sonically going for something that is a little bit outside the box, non-traditional, I felt was an appropriate approach. I feel like I'm making art on this show." Alex Patsavas serves as music supervisor, having done so on all of Schwartz and Savage's previous series. On January 12, 2018, a soundtrack from the first season consisting of 12 licensed tracks plus two by Khosla, was released digitally.

Additionally, the original score for the series was released digitally on January 26. All music by Siddhartha Khosla:

Marvel Cinematic Universe tie-ins
Loeb confirmed in July 2017 that the series would be set in the MCU but that the show's characters would not be concerned with the actions of the Avengers, for example, saying, "Would you be following Iron Man [on social media] or would you be following someone your own age? The fact that they've found each other and they're going through this mystery together at the moment is what we're concerned about, not what Captain America is doing." The showrunners considered the series' connection to the MCU to be "liberating" since it allowed them to set the series in a universe where superheroes and fantasy are already established and do not need to be explained to the audience. Schwartz said they "were very capable of telling the story that we wanted to tell independent of any of the other Marvel stories that are out there." Initially, Loeb had said that there were no plans to crossover across networks with the similarly themed Cloak & Dagger on Freeform, as Marvel wanted the series to find its footing before further connecting with other elements of the universe, though "You'll see things that comment on each other; we try to touch base wherever we can... things that are happening in L.A. are not exactly going to be affecting what's happening in New Orleans [where Cloak & Dagger is set]... It's being aware of it and trying to find a way [to connect] that makes sense." On August 1, 2019, it was revealed that season 3 would include a crossover episode with Cloak & Dagger.

Roxxon Energy, a company featured throughout the MCU, has its logo shown in the series. It also mentions Wakanda. Speaking to the third season, the showrunners said the series would "deepen [its] connection" to the Marvel Universe. It features the Dark Dimension, as well as the Darkhold as it was portrayed on Agents of S.H.I.E.L.D..

Marketing
Cast members and Schwartz and Savage appeared at New York Comic Con 2017 to promote the series, where a trailer for the series was revealed, along with a screening of the first episode. The series had its red carpet premiere at the Regency Bruin Theatre in Westwood, Los Angeles on November 16, 2017.

Release
Runaways premiered its first three episodes on Hulu in the United States on November 21, 2017, with the first season consisting of 10 episodes, and concluding on January 9, 2018. The series aired on Showcase in Canada, premiering on November 22, and aired on Syfy in the United Kingdom premiering on April 18, 2018. The premiere episode made its broadcast debut in the United States on Freeform on August 2, 2018, following the airing of the first-season finale of Cloak & Dagger; the airing is part of Freeform's ongoing marketing partnership with Hulu. The first season was also made available on Disney+ when it launched on November 12, 2019. The second season, consisting of 13 episodes, was released in its entirety on December 21, 2018. The third season was released on December 13, 2019, and became available on Disney+, along with season two, on January 10, 2020.

Reception

Critical response
{{Television critical response
| series            = Runaways
| rotten_tomatoes1  = 86% (84 reviews)
| metacritic1       = 68 (22 reviews)

| rotten_tomatoes2  = 88% (24 reviews)

| rotten_tomatoes3  = 83% (12 reviews)
}}

The review aggregator website Rotten Tomatoes reported an 86% approval rating for the first season, based on 84 reviews, with an average rating of 7.8/10. The website's consensus reads, "Earnest, fun, and more balanced than its source material, Runaways finds strong footing in an over-saturated genre." Metacritic, which uses a weighted average, assigned a score of 68 out of 100 based on 22 critics, indicating "generally favorable reviews".

Reviewing the first two episodes of the series, Joseph Schmidt of ComicBook.com praised the show for its faithfulness to the comics, but also for some of the changes it made, appreciating the increased focus on the parents. He thought the cast portraying the Runaways was "pretty spot on", but "many of the parents are scene stealers", highlighting the performances of Marsters, Wersching, and Pardue.

The second season has an approval rating of 88% on Rotten Tomatoes, based on 24 reviews, with an average rating of 6.6/10. The website's critical consensus states, "Runaways hits the ground running in its sophomore season, but though it deepens the connections between its expansive cast, formulaic stories and an over-dependence on plot devices holds it back from fully maturing into a compelling character study."

The third season has an approval rating of 83% on Rotten Tomatoes, based on 12 reviews, with an average rating of 7.9/10. The website's critical consensus states, "By focusing on its strong ensemble and the character moments fans have come to love, Runaways ends its three season run on an exciting–and surprisingly introspective–high note."

Accolades

References

External links
 
 
 

2010s American LGBT-related drama television series
2010s American science fiction television series
2010s American teen drama television series
2017 American television series debuts
2019 American television series endings
American action television series
English-language television shows
Hulu original programming
Lesbian-related television shows
LGBT-related superhero television shows
 
Serial drama television series
Teen superhero television series
Television shows based on Marvel Comics
Television series about teenagers
Television series by ABC Signature Studios
Television shows filmed in Los Angeles
Television shows set in Los Angeles